In mathematics, the Poisson boundary is a measure space associated to a random walk. It is an object designed to encode the asymptotic behaviour of the random walk, i.e. how trajectories diverge when the number of steps goes to infinity. Despite being called a boundary it is in general a purely measure-theoretical object and not a boundary in the topological sense. However, in the case where the random walk is on a topological space the Poisson boundary can be related to the Martin boundary which is an analytic construction yielding a genuine topological boundary. Both boundaries are related to harmonic functions on the space via generalisations of the Poisson formula.

The case of the hyperbolic plane 

The Poisson formula states that given a positive harmonic function   on the unit disc  (that is,  where  is the Laplace–Beltrami operator associated to the Poincaré metric on ) there exists a unique measure  on the boundary  such that the equality 
 where  is the Poisson kernel, 
holds for all . This analytical interpretation of the set  leads to the more general notion of minimal Martin boundary (which in this case is the full Martin boundary).

This fact can also be interpreted in a probabilistic manner. Thus the Poisson formula identifies this measured space with the Martin boundary constructed above, and ultimately to  endowed with the class of Lebesgue measure (note that this identification can be made directly since a path in Wiener space converges almost surely to a point on ).

This gives an identification of the extremal positive harmonic functions on the group, and to the space of trajectories of the random walk on the group (both with respect to a given probability measure), with the topological/measured space .

Definition

The Poisson boundary of a random walk on a discrete group 

It is possible to give an implicit definition of the Poisson boundary as the maximal -set with a -stationary measure , satisfying the additional condition that  almost surely weakly converges to a Dirac mass.

The Poisson formula 

Then the random variable  is a discrete-time martingale and so it converges almost surely. If  is either positive or bounded then  is as well and we have the Poisson formula:
 

General definition 

The general setting is that of a Markov operator on a measured space, a notion which generalises the Markov operator  associated to a random walk. Much of the theory can be developed in this abstract and very general setting.

The Martin boundary

Martin boundary of a discrete group 

Let  be a random walk on a discrete group. The Green kernel is by definition:
 
If the walk is transient then this series is convergent for all . Fix a point  and define the Martin kernel by: 
. 
The embedding  has a relatively compact image for the topology of pointwise convergence, and the Martin compactification is the closure of this image. A point  is usually represented by the notation .

The Martin kernels are positive harmonic functions and every positive harmonic function can be expressed as an integral of functions on the boundary, that is for every positive harmonic function there is a measure  on  such that a Poisson-like formula holds:

The measures  are supported on the minimal Martin boundary, whose elements can also be characterised by being minimal. A positive harmonic function  is said to be minimal if for any harmonic function  with  there exists  such that .

There is actually a whole family of Martin compactifications. Define the Green generating series as

Denote by  the radius of convergence of this power series
and define for  the -Martin kernel by
.
The closure of the embedding  is called the -Martin compactification.

Martin boundary of a Riemannian manifold 

For a Riemannian manifold the Martin boundary is constructed, when it exists, in the same way as above, using the Green function of the Laplace–Beltrami operator . In this case there is again a whole family of Martin compactifications associated to the operators  for  where  is the bottom of the spectrum. Examples where this construction can be used to define a compactification are bounded domains in the plane and symmetric spaces of non-compact type.

The relationship between Martin and Poisson boundaries 

The measure  corresponding to the constant function is called the harmonic measure on the Martin boundary. With this measure the Martin boundary is isomorphic to the Poisson boundary.

Examples

Nilpotent groups 

The Poisson and Martin boundaries are trivial for symmetric random walks in nilpotent groups. On the other hand, when the random walk is non-centered, the study of the full Martin boundary, including the minimal functions, is far less conclusive.

Lie groups and discrete subgroups 

For random walks on a semisimple Lie group (with step distribution absolutely continuous with respect to the Haar measure) the Poisson boundary is equal to the Furstenberg boundary. The Poisson boundary of the Brownian motion on the associated symmetric space is also the Furstenberg boundary. The full Martin boundary is also well-studied in these cases and can always be described in a geometric manner. For example, for groups of rank one (for example the isometry groups of hyperbolic spaces) the full Martin boundary is the same as the minimal Martin boundary (the situation in higher-rank groups is more complicated).

The Poisson boundary of a Zariski-dense subgroup of a semisimple Lie group, for example a lattice, is also equal to the Furstenberg boundary of the group.

Hyperbolic groups 

For random walks on a hyperbolic group, under rather weak assumptions on the step distribution which always hold for a simple walk (a more general condition is that the first moment be finite) the Poisson boundary is always equal to the Gromov boundary. For example, the Poisson boundary of a free group is the space of ends of its Cayley tree. The identification of the full Martin boundary is more involved; in case the random walk has finite range (the step distribution is supported on a finite set) the Martin boundary coincides with the minimal Martin boundary and both coincide with the Gromov boundary.

Notes

References 

Harmonic analysis
Stochastic processes
Compactification (mathematics)